Peter Helmer Turner (April 11, 1813June 4, 1885) was an American pioneer and politician.

Biography

Born in Ilion, New York, Turner was in the merchandise business and was in the milling business while living in Ellisburg, New York. In 1840, he moved to Genesee, Milwaukee County, Wisconsin Territory, and then to the town of Palmyra, in Jefferson County. He was elected to the first Wisconsin Constitutional Convention of 1846 serving as a Democrat. Turner then served in the Wisconsin State Assembly in 1848 and in the Wisconsin State Senate in 1850. In 1859, Turner moved to Madison, Wisconsin, where he served on the Madison Common Council and served as president. Turner moved to Dakota Territory in 1871 settling in the Vermillion Valley. He then moved to Sioux City, Iowa, where he died in 1885.

Relatives 
There are unsourced assertions on some websites that he was the brother of Joseph Turner (Wisconsin politician), who also came to Wisconsin Territory in 1840.

References

External links
 

|-

1813 births
1885 deaths
People from Ilion, New York
People from Ellisburg, New York
Politicians from Sioux City, Iowa
People from Jefferson County, Wisconsin
People from Genesee, Wisconsin
Businesspeople from New York (state)
Wisconsin city council members
Democratic Party Wisconsin state senators
19th-century American politicians
19th-century American businesspeople
Democratic Party members of the Wisconsin State Assembly